Painshill (also referred to as "Pains Hill" in some 19th-century texts), near Cobham, Surrey, England, is one of the finest remaining examples of an 18th-century English landscape park. It was designed and created between 1738 and 1773 by Charles Hamilton. The original house built in the park by Hamilton has since been demolished.

Painshill is owned by Elmbridge Borough Council and managed by the Painshill Trust. Painshill, which is open to the public (with entry charge), has been Grade I listed on the Register of Historic Parks and Gardens. In 1998 Painshill was awarded the Europa Nostra Medal for the "Exemplary restoration from a state of extreme neglect, of a most important 18th century landscape park and its extraordinary buildings." In May 2006, Painshill was awarded full collection status for its John Bartram Heritage Collection, by the National Council for the Conservation of Plants and Gardens (NCCPG).

History

Charles Hamilton was born in 1704 in Dublin, the 9th son and 14th child of the 6th Earl of Abercorn. He was educated at Westminster School and Oxford, and went on two Grand Tours, one in 1725 and a further one in 1732.

His creation was among the earliest to reflect the changing fashion in garden design prompted by the Landscape Movement, which started in England in about 1730. Hamilton used what today are called organic gardening and organic lawn management techniques. It represented the move away from geometric formality in garden design to a new naturalistic formula. Many of the trees and shrubs planted by Hamilton were sent to him from Philadelphia by the naturalist John Bartram. The garden was open to respectable visitors, who were shown round by the head gardener for a tip, and was visited by many well-known figures including two visits by William Gilpin, pioneer of the Picturesque, Thomas Jefferson with John Adams, and Prince Franz of Anhalt-Dessau separately, on special tours of gardens, and the important landscape garden author Thomas Whately. Then as now there was a particular route round the park recommended, designed to bring the visitor upon the successive views with best effect. Views from Painshill were painted on some pieces of the Frog Service commissioned by Catherine the Great of Russia from Wedgwood.

Hamilton eventually ran out of money and sold the estate in 1773 to Benjamin Bond Hopkins, who held the estate until his death in 1794. In 1778 Hopkins commissioned architect Richard Jupp to rebuild Painshill House in a different place within the park. The house was later extended in the 19th century by architect Decimus Burton and is now a grade II* listed building.

Henry Lawes Luttrell, 2nd Earl of Carhampton (7 August 1743 – 25 April 1821) bought Painshill in 1807 from William Moffat. Luttrell lived at Painshill having fled from the ancestral Luttrellstown Castle near Clonsilla outside Dublin, where his role in crushing the Irish Rebellion in 1798 made it unsafe to stay. (His ancestor Colonel Henry Luttrell had been assassinated in Dublin in 1717 for betraying the Irish to King William III of England.) After his death in 1821, Luttrell's wife Jane lived at Painshill until her death in 1831 when it was sold it to Sir William Cooper, High Sheriff of Surrey.

Sir William Cooper and his wife, later his widow, lived there until 1863, and installed Joseph Bramah's suspension bridge and water wheel, and planted an arboretum designed by John Claudius Loudon. In 1873, the English poet, literary and social critic, Matthew Arnold, rented Pains Hill Cottage from Mr. Charles J. Leaf and lived there until his death in 1888. In 1904 Charles Combe of Cobham Park purchased and lived in Painshill Park, his son having moved into Cobham Park.

Until World War II Painshill Park was held by a succession of private owners. In 1948 the estate was split up and sold in separate lots for commercial uses. The Park's features fell into decay.

By 1980 the local authority, Elmbridge Borough Council, had bought  of Hamilton's original estate and the work of restoring the landscape garden and its many features could start. In the following year the Painshill Park Trust was founded as a registered charity with the remit "to restore Painshill as nearly as possible to Charles Hamilton's Original Concept of a Landscaped Garden for the benefit of the public." There is a wealth of 18th-century images of the main features of Painshill to help the process.

The restoration of this Grade I continued, in 2013 work was completed on the restoration of the Crystal Grotto, further restoration work in the park is dependent on the availability of funding. The landscape garden has been a location for film and television production, such as for the grounds of "Bridgeford University" in the 2009 ITV2 series Trinity and the exteriors in the movie adaptation of Oscar Wilde's The Picture of Dorian Gray (2009 film). In 2017, Painshill Park was featured in the science fiction television series Black Mirror, episode "Hang the DJ". The park now borders the A3 road, which allows easy access.

Description

Today Painshill comprises  of the original more than  owned by Charles Hamilton in the 18th century. The landscape garden stretches along the banks of the winding River Mole on land that has a number of natural hills and valleys.

The water for the lake and the plantings is pumped from the River Mole by a 19th-century beam engine powered by a water wheel. Hamilton enhanced the views of hills and lake by careful plantings of woods, avenues and specimen trees to create vistas and separate environments including an amphitheatre, a water meadow and an alpine valley. As focal points in the vistas and as sympathetic elements to be discovered in the landscape, Hamilton placed a number of follies, small decorative buildings, which include a grotto, Gothic "temple", "ruins" of a Gothic abbey, a Roman mausoleum, and a Gothic tower with a view of the countryside.

All these still exist and have been restored, and the hermitage (for which a "hermit" was hired on a seven-year contract, but soon dismissed for absenteeism) and Turkish tent have been recreated. The crystal grotto was restored in 2013, and re-opened by Lady Lucinda Lambton. The Roman "Temple of Bacchus" has been reconstructed (2018), though there is now a cast of the Roman statue of Bacchus which it housed, among other antiquities bought on Hamilton's Italian tours. It was sketched in 1770 by the Swedish artist Elias Martin; he went on to illustrate the 1783 book Bacchi Tempel ("The Temple of Bacchus") by Sweden's national bard, Carl Michael Bellman.

In 2010, a conference at Painshill brought together elements of the restoration of this eighteenth-century Landscape Garden.

Gallery of features and follies

See also

 Hagaparken – Copper Tents, Turkish Kiosk, Chinese Pavilion, Haga Echo Temple
 Robert Hibbert

References

External links

 
 Imag(in)e the Garden - History of Painshill

Borough of Elmbridge
Grade II listed garden and park buildings
Grade II* listed garden and park buildings
Grade I listed parks and gardens in Surrey
Grade II listed buildings in Surrey
Grade II* listed buildings in Surrey
Lakes of Surrey
NCCPG collections in England
Parks and open spaces in Surrey